Shannon James Augare was a Democratic member of the Montana Legislature. He was elected for Senate District 8 in 2010. He did not run for re-election in 2014. Previously, he served in the Montana House of Representatives, representing District 16 from 2007 until the end of 2010.

References

External links
Project Vote Smart - Representative Shannon Augare (MT) profile

Democratic Party members of the Montana House of Representatives
Living people
People from Browning, Montana
Native American state legislators in Montana
Democratic Party Montana state senators
Year of birth missing (living people)